Sam Janus may refer to: 

 Samuel Janus, American psychotherapist and author
 Samantha Janus, English actress sometimes credited as Sam Janus